Paraplatyptilia nana is a moth of the family Pterophoridae first described by James Halliday McDunnough in 1927. It is found in North America, including British Columbia and Alberta.

References

Moths described in 1927
nana
Moths of North America